"I Hope You're Happy Now" is a song recorded by American country music artists Carly Pearce and Lee Brice. It was released in October 2019 as the second single from Pearce's self-titled studio album.

Content
Pearce co-wrote "I Hope You're Happy Now" with Luke Combs, Randy Montana, and Jonathan Singleton. Recorded as a duet with Lee Brice, it tells the story of a breakup from both sides, and was inspired by Pearce's own past relationship. Combs was originally going to be featured on the song, but when he chose to step down, Pearce reached out to Brice who was impressed by the lyrics and said that the song reminded him of "classic country." The track and its parent album were produced by busbee, the last project he completed before his death.

The song is composed in the key of B-flat major with a main chord pattern of B-Gm-E-B.

Critical reception
Billy Dukes of Taste of Country described the song as "compelling" and wrote that the artists were "two of country's finest vocalists." Markos Papadatos of Digital Journal wrote that the song allowed Pearce and Brice to "showcase their storytelling abilities," and complemented their vocal chemistry. Rolling Stone named the song one of the 25 best country and Americana songs of 2019, with reviewer Jon Freeman writing, "the combination of their voices was electric", and that the song was a "true stunner".

Music video
The music video for "I Hope You're Happy Now" was directed by Sam Siske and shot in a dive bar in Nashville, Tennessee located near the Grand Ole Opry, and features Pearce and Brice performing the song together on stage while patrons in the bar carry out the lyrics in the song.

Commercial performance
"I Hope You're Happy Now" reached the top 30 of the Billboard Country Airplay chart in its sixth week, making it the fastest-rising single of Pearce's career. It has since reached a peak position of number one, becoming Pearce's second number one single and Brice's sixth. The song has sold 62,000 copies in the United States as of March 2020.

Performances
Pearce performed the song with Charles Kelley of Lady A at the 54th Annual Country Music Association Awards on November 11, 2020 after Brice tested positive for COVID-19 a few days before, and thus was unable to perform with Pearce. Brice and Pearce were able to perform it together at the 56th Academy of Country Music Awards on April 18, 2021.

Charts

Weekly charts

Year-end charts

Certifications

References

 

2019 singles
2019 songs
Big Machine Records singles
Carly Pearce songs
Lee Brice songs
Song recordings produced by busbee
Songs written by Luke Combs
Songs written by Randy Montana
Songs written by Jonathan Singleton
Male–female vocal duets